Jasper Griffin  (29 May 1937 – 22 November 2019) was a British classicist and academic. He was Public Orator and Professor of Classical Literature in the University of Oxford from 1992 until 2004.

Early life
Griffin was born on 29 May 1937. He was educated on a scholarship at Christ's Hospital, a private school in Horsham, West Sussex. He read Classical Moderations and Greats at Balliol College, Oxford between 1956 and 1960. He graduated with a first class Bachelor of Arts degree. He was Jackson Fellow at Harvard University from 1960 to 1961 where he undertook research in early Latin poets.

Academic career
On his return to the University of Oxford, Griffin became Dyson Junior Research Fellow at Balliol College (1961–63), tutorial fellow in Classics (1963–2004), and senior fellow (2000–04). He is the originator of the word "agostic" used by the organometallic chemist Malcolm Green to describe C-H-M interactions.

Personal life
Griffin's wife of more than fifty years, Dr Miriam T. Griffin (née Dressler), was also a noteworthy classicist. Their three daughters, Julia, Miranda and Tamara, survive them.

Honours
Griffin was elected a Fellow of the British Academy in 1986.

Publications

Author
Homer: the Odyssey (Cambridge: Cambridge University Press, 1987, 2nd edn 2004)
Homer (Oxford: Oxford University Press, 1980, 2nd edn, London: Bristol Classical Press, 2001)
Virgil (2nd edn, London: Bristol Classical Press, 2001)
The art of snobbery (London: Robinson, 1998)
Latin poets and Roman life (London: Duckworth, 1985, 2nd edn, London: Bristol Classical Press, 1994)
The mirror of myth: classical themes & variations (London: Faber and Faber, 1986)
Homer on life and death (Oxford: Clarendon Press; New York: Oxford University Press, 1980)
Snobs (Oxford; New York: Oxford University Press, 1982)

Editor
Homer: Iliad, Book nine (Oxford: Clarendon Press, 1995)
Sophocles revisited: essays presented to Sir Hugh Lloyd-Jones (Oxford: Oxford University Press, 1999)
The Oxford history of the classical world (with John Boardman and Oswyn Murray, Oxford: Oxford University Press, 1986), subsequently published as The Oxford history of Greece and the Hellenistic world (Oxford: Oxford University Press, 1991, 2nd edn 2001, illustrated edn 2001) and The Oxford history of the Roman world (with John Boardman and Oswyn Murray, Oxford: Oxford University Press, 1991, 2nd edn 2001, illustrated edn 2001)

References

External links

 Tom Bewley, 'The end of an era', Floreat Domus: Balliol College News Issue 10 (March 2004)

1937 births
2019 deaths
People educated at Christ's Hospital
Alumni of Balliol College, Oxford
English classical scholars
Fellows of Balliol College, Oxford
Fellows of the British Academy
Harvard Fellows
Public Orators of the University of Oxford